This is a list of casinos in New York.

List of casinos

Gallery

See also

List of casinos in the United States 
List of casino hotels

References

 

  
Casinos
New York